Lafortune may refer to:

Bill LaFortune (born 1957), mayor of Tulsa, Oklahoma from 2002 to 2006
Charles Lafortune (born 1969), Quebec, Canadian actor and television and radio personality 
David Arthur Lafortune (1848–1922), Quebec, Canada lawyer and politician, member of the  Canadian House of Commons
Felicity LaFortune (born 1954), American actress and singer
François Lafortune, Sr. (1896-????), Belgian rifle shooter and Olympian
François Lafortune, Jr. (born 1932), Belgian rifle shooter and Olympian 
Hubert Lafortune (1889-????), Belgian gymnast and Olympian 
Jeanne Lafortune, Canadian economist based in Chile
Luc Lafortune (born 1958), Canadian lighting designer in the entertainment industry. One of the original designers of Cirque du Soleil
Marcel Lafortune (1900-????), Belgian rifle shooter and Olympian
Robert J. LaFortune (born 1927), American Republican politician and mayor of Tulsa, Oklahoma from 1970 to 1978